The GA16DE is an Inline-four engine made by Nissan. It is found in many Nissan models, like the Nissan Sunny (N14 and B14), the Nissan Almera (N15), and the Nissan Primera (P10, injection models, P11 & P11-144) 100NX. It is very similar to the GA14DE, aside from a larger displacement.

The GA16DE is a robust, reliable engine with a displacement of 1596cc. In North America it was used in the 1991-1999 Sentra, 200SX, and NX models. Later-model GA16DE (95-99) engines had more aggressive cams, straighter intake ports and performed slightly better. Despite being designed for economy, GA16DE-powered cars are also somewhat popular in tuning circles, due to a smooth powerband and good response to bolt-on modifications. The factory redline is set to 6900rpms, with aftermarket tuning increasing it to 7300.

In the UK it was featured in the first 3 incarnations of the Nissan Primera featuring good fuel economy and, despite its low displacement, decent performance thanks to its Twin cams and 16 valve configuration. Power (based on the 96-99 1.6 primera) is  @ 6000 rpm.

In Australia it was used in the Nissan Pulsar N14 and N15.

A GA16DE was also released with the NVCS (Nissan Variable Cam [timing] System) solenoid, it carries the plastic rocker black valve cover with a different throttle body design which produced 115 hp (85 kW) @6400 rpm and 110 lb·ft (146 Nm) @4400 rpm. The solenoid "opens" completely at 4,000 rpm.

It has a 76mm bore and 88mm stroke with 9.5:1 Compression Ratio.

See also
 Nissan GA engine

References

http://mywikimotors.com/ga16de/

Nissan engines